Union Township is an inactive township in Franklin County, in the U.S. state of Missouri.

Union Township was established in 1866, taking its name from the community of Union, Missouri.

References

Townships in Missouri
Townships in Franklin County, Missouri